Stetsonia coryne, the toothpick cactus, is the sole species in the cactus genus Stetsonia. The plant is native to the deserts and dry forest (Gran Chaco) of Argentina, Bolivia and Paraguay. It has white flowers. The genus was named to honor Francis Lynde Stetson, a New York attorney and plant lover.

Description

The plant is large, arborescent habit , tree-like reaches a growth height of 5 to 8 meters up to 12 meters. The trunk is thick and short, measuring about 4 dm in diameter, with numerous erect or somewhat bent branches form from a trunk. The blue-green shoots, turn greenish-gray with age, usually not jointed and have a diameter of 9 to 10 centimeters. There are 8 to 9 blunt-edged, somewhat notched ribs that are 1 to 1.5 centimeters high. The yellow spines, which later turn black, are straight and stiff. The central spine grows to 2-5 cm long and are thickened at the base., the 7 to 9 spreading marginal spines to 3 centimeters long. There is a single central spine, straight and more robust, which can measure up to 8 cm in length. All are black or yellowish-brown in color, although they eventually turn white with a dark tip.

It flowers from October to April with funnel-shaped flowers that are white and grow up to 15 centimeters in diameter. They open at night and often remain open until the next day. The pericarp is covered with numerous, roof-tile-like, the long corolla tube with scattered scales.

The plant fruits from January to May and its fruit is a fleshy berry 4 cm in diameter ovoid, scaled, edible fruits are green to reddish and have a drooping floral remnant. The broadly oval, shiny blackish-brown seeds are 1.7 millimeters long and 1 millimeter wide. They are humped with a fine wrinkled pattern.

References

External links

Cactoideae